Urophyllum is a genus of flowering plant in the family Rubiaceae, native to from south China to Tropical Asia. The genus was established by Nathaniel Wallich in 1824.

Species
, Plants of the World Online accepted the following species:

Urophyllum acuminatissimum Merr.
Urophyllum aequale Craib
Urophyllum andamanicum King & Gamble
Urophyllum angustifolium Valeton
Urophyllum arboreum (Reinw. ex Blume) Korth.
Urophyllum argenteum Pit.
Urophyllum assahanicum (Bremek.) Smedmark & B.Bremer
Urophyllum attenuatum Valeton
Urophyllum bataanense Elmer
Urophyllum bismarckii-montis Valeton
Urophyllum borneense Miq.
Urophyllum bracteolatum Ridl.
Urophyllum britannicum Wernham
Urophyllum bullatum Ridl.
Urophyllum calycinum Valeton
Urophyllum capitatum Valeton
Urophyllum capituliflorum Valeton
Urophyllum capituligerum Ridl.
Urophyllum castaneum Ridl.
Urophyllum caudatum Merr.
Urophyllum cephalotes Ridl.
Urophyllum ceylanicum (Wight) Thwaites
Urophyllum chinense Merr. & Chun
Urophyllum chlamydanthum (Bremek.) Smedmark & B.Bremer
Urophyllum clemensiorum Smedmark & B.Bremer
Urophyllum coffeoides (Bremek.) Smedmark & B.Bremer
Urophyllum congestiflorum Ridl.
Urophyllum corniculatum (Bremek.) Smedmark & B.Bremer
Urophyllum corymbosum (Blume) Korth.
Urophyllum crassum Craib
Urophyllum curtisii King ex M.R.Hend.
Urophyllum cyphandrum Stapf
Urophyllum deliense (Bremek.) Smedmark & B.Bremer
Urophyllum ellipticum (Wight) Thwaites
Urophyllum elliptifolium Merr.
Urophyllum elmeri (Bremek.) Smedmark & B.Bremer
Urophyllum elongatum (Korth.) Miq.
Urophyllum endertii (Bremek.) Smedmark & B.Bremer
Urophyllum enneandrum (Wight) Ridl.
Urophyllum ferrugineum King & Gamble
Urophyllum fuscum Craib
Urophyllum glabrum Jack ex Wall.
Urophyllum glaucescens Valeton
Urophyllum glomeratum Valeton
Urophyllum grandiflorum Valeton
Urophyllum grandifolium Ridl.
Urophyllum griffithianum (Wight) Hook.f.
Urophyllum heteromerum K.Schum.
Urophyllum hexandrum Kuntze
Urophyllum hirsutum (Wight) Hook.f.
Urophyllum holectomium (Bremek.) Smedmark & B.Bremer
Urophyllum johannis-winkleri Merr.
Urophyllum kinabaluense (Bremek.) Smedmark & B.Bremer
Urophyllum korthalsii Miq.
Urophyllum lanaense (Merr.) Smedmark & B.Bremer
Urophyllum lasiocarpum Ridl.
Urophyllum lecomtei Pit.
Urophyllum leucocarpum (Bremek.) Smedmark & B.Bremer
Urophyllum leucophlaeum Ridl.
Urophyllum leytense Merr.
Urophyllum lineatum Stapf
Urophyllum longidens Stapf
Urophyllum longifolium (Wight) Hook.f.
Urophyllum longipes Craib
Urophyllum longipetalum Ridl.
Urophyllum macrophyllum (Blume) Korth.
Urophyllum macrurum (Bremek.) Smedmark & B.Bremer
Urophyllum magnifolium (Bremek.) Smedmark & B.Bremer
Urophyllum maingayi (King & Gamble) Smedmark & B.Bremer
Urophyllum malayense K.M.Wong
Urophyllum melanocarpum Ridl.
Urophyllum memecyloides (C.Presl) S.Vidal
Urophyllum micranthum Miq.
Urophyllum mindorense Merr.
Urophyllum minutiflorum Merr.
Urophyllum moluccanum Miq.
Urophyllum motleyi Ridl.
Urophyllum neriifolium Ridl.
Urophyllum nigricans Wernham
Urophyllum oblongum Craib
Urophyllum oligophlebium Merr.
Urophyllum olivaceum Craib
Urophyllum opacum (Bremek.) Smedmark & B.Bremer
Urophyllum oresitrophum (Bremek.) Koizumi & Nagam.
Urophyllum pallidum Merr.
Urophyllum panayense Merr.
Urophyllum paniculatum Ridl.
Urophyllum parviflorum F.C.How ex H.S.Lo
Urophyllum parvistipulum (Bremek.) Smedmark & B.Bremer
Urophyllum peltistigma Miq.
Urophyllum pilosum Ridl.
Urophyllum platyphyllum Elmer
Urophyllum polyneurum Miq.
Urophyllum porphyraceum (Mart. ex Rosenthal) Baill.
Urophyllum pubescens Valeton
Urophyllum rahmatii Merr.
Urophyllum reticulatum Elmer
Urophyllum rostratum Valeton
Urophyllum rufescens (Bremek.) Smedmark & B.Bremer
Urophyllum salicifolium Stapf
Urophyllum sandahanicum (Bremek.) Smedmark & B.Bremer
Urophyllum schmidtii C.B.Clarke
Urophyllum sessiliflorum Ridl.
Urophyllum sintangense (Bremek.) Smedmark & B.Bremer
Urophyllum streptopodium Wall. ex Hook.f.
Urophyllum strigosum (Blume) Korth.
Urophyllum subanurum Stapf
Urophyllum subglabrum Merr.
Urophyllum talangense Craib
Urophyllum tonkinense Pit.
Urophyllum trifurcum H.Pearson ex King
Urophyllum tsaianum F.C.How ex H.S.Lo
Urophyllum umbelliferum Valeton
Urophyllum umbellulatum Miq.
Urophyllum urdanetense Elmer
Urophyllum villosum Wall.
Urophyllum vulcanicum Ridl.
Urophyllum wichmannii Valeton
Urophyllum wollastonii Wernham
Urophyllum woodii Merr.
Urophyllum yatesii Ridl.

References

 
Rubiaceae genera
Taxonomy articles created by Polbot